San Andrés Villa Seca is a town and municipality in the Retalhuleu Department of Guatemala.

References 

Municipalities of the Retalhuleu Department